The Bona Allen Building is a historic nine-story office building, built in 1917, in downtown Atlanta, Georgia.

It was designed by architect John F. Downing.

It later became known as the Turner Building.

Turner Building - Turner Enterprises - Ted Turner

Formerly home to the Atlanta Police Department and Visiting Nurses Corporation, the building now houses Turner Enterprises, Inc., Captain Planet Foundation, ...

Turner Building| Downtown Atlanta, GA
 Turner Building. Office Space. Address. 133 Luckie St NW Atlanta, GA 30303 ... Switchyards Downtown Club151 Ted Turner Dr NW (55 feet NE); Ted's Montana ...

The Turner Building - Atlanta Better Buildings Challenge

Dec 23, 2014 - Property Address: 133 Luckie Street NW, Atlanta GA 30303. Website: www.tedturner.com/about/bona-allen-building. Year(s) Top Performer ...

Where Ted Turner's name will no longer be in Atlanta - AJC.com

Mar 5, 2019 - A piece of Ted Turner's legacy is disappearing from Atlanta ... TNT, TBS and Turner Field were reminders in big letters on buildings and a ...

Ted Turner - Atlanta Magazine
Anniversary
May 1, 2011 - In the forty years he has been in the public eye, Ted Turner has been ... his compact nine-floor office building on Luckie Street in Downtown.

Bona-Allen Building, Atlanta | 193451 | EMPORIS

Bona-Allen Building is a 9-story low-rise building in Atlanta, Georgia, U.S.A.. ... Ted's Montana Grill restaurant, which serves buffalo meat from Ted Turner's ranch ...

See also
Bona Allen Company
Bona Allen Mansion

References

External links

GA
Buildings and structures completed in 1917
Buildings and structures in Atlanta